Christopher H. Browne (1946 – December 13, 2009) was a famous value investor, and longtime director at the firm Tweedy, Browne. Browne was often known as one of the best value investors ever.

Biography

Early life
He graduated from the University of Pennsylvania in 1969 with a B.A. in history.

Career
He started his career at the firm Tweedy, Browne, co-founded by his father Howard Browne and a favorite brokerage firm among prominent value investors like Benjamin Graham and Warren Buffett. His success as an investor and shareholder, who held business management accountable, was renowned. For example, both Tweedy, Browne's Value and Global Value Funds outperformed market averages between 1993 and 2009. In 2003, Browne was the first to publicly speak up about irregularities in Conrad Black's management of Hollinger, reporting Black to the Securities and Exchange Commission. Black was forced out later that year and ultimately convicted of fraud.

In 2006 Browne authored a book, The Little Book of Value Investing, in order to teach ordinary investors the principles used throughout his career.

Philanthropy
Browne donated $25 million to establish several endowed professorships at the University of Pennsylvania, where he was a trustee. His donation funded professorships held by Amy Gutmann and Rogers Smith.

Death
Upon his 2009 death, Christopher Browne was survived by his partner, architect Andrew S. Gordon, who then died on September 7, 2013.

His will left the bulk of a $250 million estate to Gordon, a decades-younger and relatively new boyfriend. Several of Browne's family and friends accused Gordon of exercising undue influence to obtain Browne's estate, and filed a will contest. In 2013, a judge upheld the validity of Brown's last will and testament, and Gordon settled for undisclosed amounts to those who challenged the will.

References

1946 births
2009 deaths
American financiers
American investors
American LGBT businesspeople
20th-century American businesspeople
20th-century LGBT people
21st-century LGBT people